Assa Abloy AB is a Swedish conglomerate whose offerings include products and services related to locks, doors, gates, and entrance automation. Related products and services include controlling access and confirming identities with keys, cards, tags, mobile, and bio-metric identity verification systems.

The company was formed in 1994, when Assa AB was separated from Swedish security firm Securitas AB.  Shortly thereafter, Assa AB merged with the Finnish high security lock manufacturer Abloy Oy (based in Joensuu, a subsidiary of the Finnish company Wärtsilä).  The company was introduced to the Stockholm Stock Exchange later the same year. Assa Abloy has since made over 200 acquisitions including Yale lock, Chubb Locks, Medeco in the United States, Mul-T-Lock in Israel and Fichet-Bauche in France. Its two largest shareholders are Latour and Melker Schörling AB.

Name
Assa Abloy was founded at the merger of the two companies Assa and Abloy in 1994. Assa stands for August Stenman Stenman August. The name  comes from a contraction of the Swedish Finnish bilingual name Ab Låsfabriken Lukkotehdas Oy, meaning literally Corp. Lock Factory Lock Factory Corp. (first Corp. and Låsfabriken from Swedish, last Lukkotehdas and Corp. from Finnish). In 1919 the company was renamed Aktiebolag Lukko Osakeyhtio.

History

Founding, growth and development

Assa Abloy was formed in 1994, through the merger of Swedish firm ASSA and Finnish high security lock manufacturer Abloy. The company was introduced to the Stockholm Stock Exchange later the same year.

From a regional company with 4,700 employees in 1994, Assa Abloy has become a global group with 51,000 employees in 2021. The company has grown its revenue by more than 9% annually and operates now in over 70 countries.

Revenue in 2021 was SEK 95,007 M.

Brands

 ASSA, Sweden (name giver) (August Stenman Stenman August)
 Abloy, Joensuu & Helsinki, Finland (name giver) (AktieBolag Lukko OsakeYhtiö)
 Arrow, United States
 August Home, United States
 Besam, Sweden (Bertil Samuelsson)
 Baron, Canada 
 Corbin Russwin, United States
 Carlisle Brass, United Kingdom 
 Emtek Products, Inc, United States
 FAB, Czech Republic
 Guoqiang, China
 HID (Hughes Identification Devices), United States
 HKC Security, Ireland
 Ikon, Germany
 JPM, France (Jean Pierre Maquennehen)
 Keso, Switzerland (Keller & Sohn)
 Litto, Belgium (Littoral)
 Lockwood, Australia
 Lorient, United Kingdom
 MAUER, Bulgaria
 Medeco, United States (Mechanical Development Company)
 Mul-T-Lock, Israel
 Phillips, Mexico
 PTI Security Systems, United States (Preffered Technology Incorporated)
 Rixson, United States
 Ruko, Denmark (Rudolf Koreska)
 Tesa, Spain (Talleres Eskoriaza Sociedad Annonima)
 St Guchi, Malaysia
 Sure-Loc Hardware, United States
 Union, United Kingdom
 Vachette, France
 VingCard Elsafe, Norway
 Yale, United States, United Kingdom, India

Acquisitions
In May 1999, the acquisition of Effeff Fritz Fuss in Germany enabled Assa Abloy to enter the electromechanical lock market. Assa Abloy also acquires Mul-T-Lock in Israel, a manufacturer of high security locks. Assa Abloy doubles in size in 2000, when it acquires the global lock group Yale Intruder Security. In the same year, Assa Abloy acquires HID, adding electronic identification to its product portfolio.

In April 2002, Assa Abloy Group acquired Besam, a Swedish company specialized in automatic pedestrian doors. Another important acquisition for the group was Fargo Electronics, a company which develops systems for safe issuing of credit, bank, debit and ID cards. This was followed by other acquisitions such as Baodean in China and Irevo in South Korea in 2007.

In 2009, the Italian door automation manufacturer, Ditec, was bought. Important acquisitions were also made in September 2011, with the purchase of Crawford and Flexiforce. A number of purchases followed in 2012. The group acquired Albany Door Systems, a manufacturer of high speed industrial doors. November 2013 came with the purchase of the Polish fire and security door manufacturer Mercor SA, Ameristar USA, and Amarr.

In December 2018, Assa Abloy acquired Lorient, a UK based designer and manufacturer of high performance door sealing systems.

In December 2018, Assa Abloy acquired Luxer One, a package locker business in the US.

In February 2020, Assa Abloy acquired the UK-based, 140-strong biometric access and workforce management technology business, Biosite.

In May 2021, Assa Abloy acquired Sure-Loc, the leading supplier of residential locks and associated hardware in the US.

In September 2021, Assa Abloy acquired the Hardware and Home Improvement ("HHI") division of Spectrum Brands for $4.3 billion. HHI has a varied portfolio of products, including patented SmartKey technology and electronic, smart and biometric locks. Key brands include Kwikset, Baldwin, Weiser, Pfister and National Hardware. HHI is headquartered in Lake Forest, California with some 7,500 employees worldwide and has manufacturing facilities in the United States, Mexico, Taiwan, China, and the Philippines.

In December 2022, Assa Abloy acquired the New York-headquartered provider of rugged handheld mobile computers and readers, Janam Technologies.

Cooperation with colleges and universities
The company is a Corporate Partner in the Stockholm School of Economics partner program for companies that contribute financially to the college and works closely with regard to research and education. In October 2015, Assa Abloy joined as partner to KTH Royal Institute of Technology’s Things, a start up hub for companies in the Internet-of-things sector.

See also

List of Swedish companies

References

Manufacturing companies established in 1994
Manufacturing companies based in Stockholm
Lock manufacturers
Wärtsilä
Companies listed on Nasdaq Stockholm
Swedish companies established in 1994
Swedish brands
Multinational companies headquartered in Sweden